The Kuwait national basketball team represents Kuwait in international basketball and is controlled by the Kuwait Basketball Association; the governing body for basketball in the country.

The team has qualified for more major international basketball tournaments than any other nation on the Arabian Peninsula.

Performance

Summer Olympics
yet to qualify

World championships
yet to qualify

FIBA Asia Cup

Asian Games

1951-70 : Did not qualify
1974 : 10th
1978 : 10th
1982 : 6th
1986 : 7th
1990-98 : Did not qualify
2002 : 10th
2006 : 17th
2010 : 13th
2014 : 9th
2018 : To be determined

Pan Arab Games

1953 : ?
1957 : ?
1961 : ?
1965 : ?
1976 : ?
1985 : ?
1992 : ?
1997 : ?
1999 : ?
2004 : ?
2007 : 5th
2011 : 6th

Islamic Solidarity Games

2005 : 12th
2013 : 4th
2017 : To be determined

Gulf Cup Champions: 1981, 1983, 1986

Roster
2015 FIBA Asia Championship squad.

Depth chart

Past rosters
2014 Asian Games squad.

Head Coach
 Mohammad Dhari (2013)
 Mensur Bajramović (2014)
 Khaled Yousef (2015)
Flagicon           Edi Dželalija (2017/2019)
 Adel Tlatli (2019–)

Kit

Sponsor
2015: Kuwait Airways

See also
 Kuwait national under-19 basketball team
 Kuwait national under-17 basketball team
 Kuwait women's national basketball team

References

External links
 Official website
 FIBA profile
 Asia-basket.com
 Kuwait Basketball Records at FIBA Archive

Men's national basketball teams
Basketball
1959 establishments in Kuwait
Basketball in Kuwait
Basketball teams in Kuwait
Basketball teams established in 1959